The Champlin Fighter Museum was an aircraft museum located at Mesa, Arizona. It specialized in airworthy World War I and World War II fighters. After 22 years of operation, the Museum was closed on May 26, 2003, and its collection was moved to the Museum of Flight at Seattle's Boeing Field.

It also published books related to aviation, such as Henry Sakaida's 1985 book Winged Samurai: Saburo Sakai and the Zero Fighter Pilots.

References

External links

 Images of aircraft exhibited

Aerospace museums in Arizona
Military and war museums in Arizona
Museums in Mesa, Arizona
Defunct museums in Arizona